Kopparstenarna is a shoal off the coast of Sweden in the Baltic Sea, north of the island of Gotska Sandön, in the northern end of the Gotland Basin.

Shoals of the Baltic Sea